Mullica Township is a township in Atlantic County, in the U.S. state of New Jersey. As of the 2020 United States census, the township's population was 5,816, a decrease of 331 (−5.4%) from the 2010 census count of 6,147, which in turn reflected an increase of 235 (+4.0%) from the 5,912 counted in the 2000 census.

Mullica Township was incorporated as a township by an act of the New Jersey Legislature on March 13, 1838, from the western section of Galloway Township. Egg Harbor City was created from portions of the township on June 14, 1858, while the Town of Hammonton was created and split off on March 5, 1866.

The township and its river were named after Eric Pålsson Mullica, an early Finnish settler born in 1636 who founded a homestead on the river after moving there from the vicinity of Philadelphia, and who later moved to Mullica Hill in Gloucester County. When used as a common noun,  is the Finnish term for a bull calf.

Geography
According to the United States Census Bureau, the township had a total area of 56.84 square miles (147.22 km2), including 56.38 square miles (146.01 km2) of land and 0.47 square miles (1.21 km2) of water (0.82%).

Despite a relatively small population, Mullica Township comprises many small communities. Elwood is an unincorporated community and census-designated place (CDP) (with a 2010 Census population of 1,437) located within Mullica Township.

Other unincorporated communities, localities and place names located partially or completely within the township include Amatol, Colwell, Da Costa, Devonshire, East Hammonton, Indian Cabin, Nesco, New Columbia, Pleasant Mills, Speedway, Sweetwater, Weekstown, Wescoatville, West Egg Harbor and Woodland. Unincorporated communities in Mullica Township are largely identified by landmarks such as the Elwood Deli, the Sweetwater Casino, or the Weekstown Firehouse. The small unincorporated communities within the township engender a particularly high level of pride, and many Mullica Township residents refer to themselves as residents of their unincorporated community, before referring to themselves as residents of Mullica Township.

The township is located in the northwest portion of Atlantic County. It is bounded on the north by Washington Township in Burlington County; on the east by Egg Harbor City; on the south by Galloway Township and Hamilton Township; and on the west by the Town of Hammonton. The Township is approximately  outside of Atlantic City and  outside of Philadelphia.

The township is one of 56 South Jersey municipalities that are included within the New Jersey Pinelands National Reserve, a protected natural area of unique ecology covering , that has been classified as a United States Biosphere Reserve and established by Congress in 1978 as the nation's first National Reserve. All of the township is included in the state-designated Pinelands Area, which includes portions of Atlantic County, along with areas in Burlington, Camden, Cape May, Cumberland, Gloucester and Ocean counties.

Demographics

2010 census

The Census Bureau's 2006–2010 American Community Survey showed that (in 2010 inflation-adjusted dollars) median household income was $54,730 (with a margin of error of +/− $11,733) and the median family income was $62,000 (+/− $10,758). Males had a median income of $42,931 (+/− $9,882) versus $41,716 (+/− $5,514) for females. The per capita income for the township was $26,217 (+/− $3,264). About 3.6% of families and 6.5% of the population were below the poverty line, including 8.1% of those under age 18 and 5.4% of those age 65 or over.

2000 census
As of the 2000 United States census there were 5,912 people, 2,044 households, and 1,537 families residing in the township. The racial makeup of the township was 80.58% White, 6.28% African American, 0.27% Native American, 0.83% Asian, 0.12% Pacific Islander, 8.61% from other races, and 3.32% from two or more races. Hispanic or Latino of any race were 16.49% of the population.

There were 2,044 households, out of which 35.9% had children under the age of 18 living with them, 59.6% were married couples living together, 10.0% had a female householder with no husband present, and 24.8% were non-families. 19.4% of all households were made up of individuals, and 7.9% had someone living alone who was 65 years of age or older.  The average household size was 2.87 and the average family size was 3.30.

In the township the population was spread out, with 27.0% under the age of 18, 7.4% from 18 to 24, 31.1% from 25 to 44, 23.9% from 45 to 64, and 10.7% who were 65 years of age or older.  The median age was 37 years. For every 100 females, there were 101.3 males.  For every 100 females age 18 and over, there were 101.1 males.

The median income for a household in the township was $50,417, and the median income for a family was $55,143. Males had a median income of $40,033 versus $29,965 for females. The per capita income for the township was $19,764.  About 5.7% of families and 7.8% of the population were below the poverty line, including 11.3% of those under age 18 and 10.8% of those age 65 or over.

Government

Local government 
Mullica Township is governed under the Township form of New Jersey municipal government, which is used in 141 municipalities (of the 564) statewide, the second-most commonly used form of government in the state. The Township Committee is comprised of five members, who are elected directly by the voters at-large in partisan elections to serve three-year terms of office on a staggered basis, with either one or two seats coming up for election each year as part of the November general election in a three-year cycle. The mayor and deputy mayor are selected at an annual reorganization meeting by the Committee from among its members to serve terms of one year. The mayor presides over Township Committee meetings.

, members of the Mullica Township Committee are Mayor Bruce D. Crowe (R, term on committee ends December 31, 2024; term as mayor ends 2022), Deputy Mayor Kristi Hanselmann (R, term on committee ends 2024; term as deputy mayor ends 2022), Deanna DeMarco (R, 2022; elected to serve an unexpired term), Lawrence E. Riffle Jr. (R, 2022) and Christopher Silva (R, 2023).

In June 2019, the Township Committee selected Bruce Crowe from a list of three names nominated by the Republican municipal committee to fill the seat expiring in December 2021 that had been held by William Cornell until he resigned from office the previous month. In the November 2019 general election, Crowe was elected to serve the balance of the term of office.

Federal, state and county representation 
Mullica Township is located in the 2nd Congressional District and is part of New Jersey's 2nd state legislative district.

 

Atlantic County is governed by a directly elected county executive and a nine-member Board of County Commissioners, responsible for legislation. The executive serves a four-year term and the commissioners are elected to staggered three-year terms, of which four are elected from the county on an at-large basis and five of the commissioners represent equally populated districts. , Atlantic County's Executive is Republican Dennis Levinson, whose term of office ends December 31, 2023. Members of the Board of County Commissioners are:

Ernest D. Coursey, District 1, including Atlantic City (part), Egg Harbor Township (part), and Pleasantville (D, 2022, Atlantic City), Chair Maureen Kern, District 2, including Atlantic City (part), Egg Harbor Township (part), Linwood, Longport, Margate City, Northfield, Somers Point and Ventnor City (R, 2024, Somers Point), Andrew Parker III, District 3, including Egg Harbor Township (part) and Hamilton Township (part) (R, Egg Harbor Township, 2023), Richard R. Dase, District 4, including Absecon, Brigantine, Galloway Township and Port Republic (R, 2022, Galloway Township), James A. Bertino, District 5, including Buena, Buena Vista Township, Corbin City, Egg Harbor City, Estell Manor, Folsom, Hamilton Township (part), Hammonton, Mullica Township and Weymouth Township (R, 2018, Hammonton), Caren L. Fitzpatrick, At-Large (D, 2023, Linwood), Frank X. Balles, At-Large (R, Pleasantville, 2024) Amy L. Gatto, Freeholder (R, 2022, Hamilton Township) and Vice Chair John W. Risley, At-Large (R, 2023, Egg Harbor Township)

Atlantic County's constitutional officers are: 
County Clerk Joesph J. Giralo (R, 2026, Hammonton), 
Sheriff Eric Scheffler (D, 2024, Northfield) and 
Surrogate James Curcio (R, 2025, Hammonton).

Politics
As of March 2011, there were a total of 4,077 registered voters in Mullica Township, of which 917 (22.5% vs. 30.5% countywide) were registered as Democrats, 1,336 (32.8% vs. 25.2%) were registered as Republicans and 1,821 (44.7% vs. 44.3%) were registered as Unaffiliated. There were 3 voters registered as Libertarians or Greens. Among the township's 2010 Census population, 66.3% (vs. 58.8% in Atlantic County) were registered to vote, including 86.3% of those ages 18 and over (vs. 76.6% countywide).

In the 2016 presidential election, Republican Donald Trump received 1,710 votes (58.0%), ahead of Democrat Hillary Clinton with 1,142 votes (38.7%) and other candidates with 97 votes (3.3%), among the 2,949 ballots cast.

In the 2012 presidential election, Republican Mitt Romney received 1,439 votes (49.1% vs. 41.1% countywide), ahead of Democrat Barack Obama with 1,430 votes (48.8% vs. 57.9%) and other candidates with 41 votes (1.4% vs. 0.9%), among the 2,933 ballots cast by the township's 4,249 registered voters, for a turnout of 69.0% (vs. 65.8% in Atlantic County). In the 2008 presidential election, Republican John McCain received 1,512 votes (49.5% vs. 41.6% countywide), ahead of Democrat Barack Obama with 1,467 votes (48.0% vs. 56.5%) and other candidates with 43 votes (1.4% vs. 1.1%), among the 3,057 ballots cast by the township's 4,278 registered voters, for a turnout of 71.5% (vs. 68.1% in Atlantic County). In the 2004 presidential election, Republican George W. Bush received 1,487 votes (53.5% vs. 46.2% countywide), ahead of Democrat John Kerry with 1,244 votes (44.8% vs. 52.0%) and other candidates with 24 votes (0.9% vs. 0.8%), among the 2,778 ballots cast by the township's 3,811 registered voters, for a turnout of 72.9% (vs. 69.8% in the whole county).

In the 2013 gubernatorial election, Republican Chris Christie received 1,315 votes (67.8% vs. 60.0% countywide), ahead of Democrat Barbara Buono with 553 votes (28.5% vs. 34.9%) and other candidates with 34 votes (1.8% vs. 1.3%), among the 1,939 ballots cast by the township's 4,288 registered voters, yielding a 45.2% turnout (vs. 41.5% in the county). In the 2009 gubernatorial election, Republican Chris Christie received 1,131 votes (53.4% vs. 47.7% countywide), ahead of Democrat Jon Corzine with 801 votes (37.8% vs. 44.5%), Independent Chris Daggett with 102 votes (4.8% vs. 4.8%) and other candidates with 35 votes (1.7% vs. 1.2%), among the 2,117 ballots cast by the township's 4,111 registered voters, yielding a 51.5% turnout (vs. 44.9% in the county).

Education 
The Mullica Township Schools serve students in pre-kindergarten through eighth grade. As of the 2020–21 school year, the district, comprised of two schools, had an enrollment of 652 students and 56.7 classroom teachers (on an FTE basis), for a student–teacher ratio of 11.5:1. Schools in the district (with 2020–21 enrollment data from the National Center for Education Statistics.) are 
Mullica Township Elementary School with 331 students in grades Pre-K–4 and 
Mullica Township Middle School with 320 students in grades 5–8. With the start of the 2016–17 school year, the Washington Township School District no longer operates and all students from Washington Township attend the Mullica Township Schools as part of a full sending/receiving relationship.

Students in ninth through twelfth grades attend Cedar Creek High School, which is located in the northern section of Egg Harbor City and opened to students in September 2010. The school is one of three high schools operated as part of the Greater Egg Harbor Regional High School District, which is comprised of the constituent municipalities of Egg Harbor City, Galloway Township and Hamilton Township, and participates in sending/receiving relationships with Port Republic and Washington Township (Burlington County). Cedar Creek High School is zoned to serve students from Egg Harbor City, Mullica Township, Port Republic and Washington Township, while students in portions of Galloway and Hamilton townships have the opportunity to attend Cedar Creek through the school of choice program or through attendance in magnet programs offered at Cedar Creek. As of the 2020–21 school year, the high school had an enrollment of 935 students and 74.8 classroom teachers (on an FTE basis), for a student–teacher ratio of 12.5:1.

Township public school students are also eligible to attend the Atlantic County Institute of Technology in the Mays Landing section of Hamilton Township or the Charter-Tech High School for the Performing Arts, located in Somers Point.

Transportation

Roads and highways

U.S. Route 30 (White Horse Pike) passes through Mullica Township. Many of the street names in Mullica Township are used on multiple, sometimes intersecting roads within the township, or reused from adjacent municipalities.  Examples are Elwood Rd, Weekstown Road, Pleasant Mills Road, and Columbia Road.  In fact, 7th Ave has two major intersections, one with County Road 612 and the other with County Road 643.  Both of the county roads are named Weekstown Road at the point where they intersect with 7th Ave, approximately 2.5 miles away from each other.

Public transportation
NJ Transit provides bus service in the township on the 554 route that runs between Lindenwold station and Atlantic City.

Notable people

People who were born in, residents of, or otherwise closely associated with Mullica Township include:

 Joseph Fralinger (1848–1927), businessman and confectioner, known for being the most successful merchandiser of salt water taffy
 Day Deborah Lipford, crowned Miss Delaware 1976, she became the first black woman to place as a semi finalist in the Miss America Pageant
 Eric Pålsson Mullica (1636–), an early Finnish settler for whom Mullica Township was named
 Charles Saalmann (1836–1909), captain of Union infantry during the American Civil War who established the Black Rose Vineyard

See also

 List of New Jersey rivers
 Mullica Hill, New Jersey, a census-designated place located within Harrison Township, New Jersey, in Gloucester County
 Mullica River, a river in southern New Jersey once known as the Little Egg Harbor River

References

External links

Mullica Township website
Mullica Township Schools

School Data for the Mullica Township Schools, National Center for Education Statistics
Cedar Creek High School website
Greater Egg Harbor Regional High School District

 
1838 establishments in New Jersey
Populated places established in 1838
Township form of New Jersey government
Townships in Atlantic County, New Jersey